Christophe Didier (born 4 February 1915 in Bour – 24 July 1978 in Strasbourg) was a Luxembourgish cyclist. Professional from 1938 to 1946, he won the Volta a Catalunya in 1940 and the Tour de Luxembourg in 1941.

Major results
1935
 1st  Amateur National Road Race Championships
1937
 2nd Grand Prix François-Faber
1938
 1st  Amateur National Road Race Championships
1939
 3rd Overall Tour de Suisse
1940
 1st  Overall Volta a Catalunya
1st Stage 4
1941
 1st Overall Tour de Luxembourg
1942
 2nd Overall Tour de Luxembourg

References

1915 births
1978 deaths
Luxembourgian male cyclists